Protestants in Morocco form a very small percentage of the total population. The largest Protestant denomination in the country is the Evangelical Church of Morocco (Eglise Evangélique au Maroc), which has links to the Reformed Church of France.

On 27 March 2010, the Moroccan magazine TelQuel stated that thousands of Moroccans had converted to Christianity. Pointing out the absence of official data, Service de presse Common Ground, cites unspecified sources that stated that about 5,000 Moroccans became Christians between 2005 and 2010. According to different estimates, there are about 25,000-45,000 Moroccan Berber or Arabized Berber descent mostly converted from Islam.

This is a list of Protestant denominations of Morocco.
Independent International (CIPC / TTC / MMC / RIC)
Assemblées de Dieu
Eglise Evangélique au Maroc
Eglise Emmanuele
Fréres Larges
Mission du Monde Arabe
Seventh-day Adventist Church
Union Evangélique Missionaire

Patricia St. John was a Protestant missionary nurse in Morocco in the post-World War II years.

References

 
Morocco